National road 52 is a route belonging to the Polish national road network. This route consists of two fragments that are not connected with each other. The first one connects Cieszyn through Bielsko-Biała with Głogoczów. The second is the north-west bypass of Krakow.

On 4 August 2016, the stretch of the Cieszyn-Bielsko-Biała expressway, previously designated as the Expressway S1, became a fragment of the national road 52.

Major cities and towns along the route 
 Cieszyn 
 Skoczów 
 Bielsko-Biała 
 Kobiernice
 Kęty
 Andrychów
 Wadowice
 Kalwaria Zebrzydowska
 Biertowice
 Głogoczów
 Mogilany
 Kraków

Axle load limit 
National road 52 has an axle limit restrictions.

The allowed axle limit is up to 11.5 tons, which is a standard limit on Polish national roads.

References 

52